Daniel Benz (born 8 August 1987) is a German male badminton player.

Achievements

BWF International Challenge/Series (1 title, 4 runners-up)
Men's doubles

 BWF International Challenge tournament
 BWF International Series tournament
 BWF Future Series tournament

References

External links 

1987 births
Living people
German male badminton players
Sportspeople from Dresden
21st-century German people